Madhu Limaye (1 May 1922 – 8 January 1995), full name: Madhukar Ramchandra Limaye, was an Indian socialist essayist and activist, particularly active in the 1970s. A follower of Ram Manohar Lohia and a fellow-traveller of George Fernandes, he was active in the Janata government that gained power at the Centre following the Emergency. He, with Raj Narain and Krishan Kant was also responsible for the collapse of the Morarji Desai-led Janata government installed by that coalition, by insisting that no member of the Janata Party could simultaneously be a member of an alternative social or political organisation. This attack on dual membership was directed specifically at members of the Janata Party who had been members of the Jan Sangh, and continued to be members of the right-wing Rashtriya Swayamsevak Sangh (RSS), the Jan Sangh's ideological parent. The issue led to fall of the Janata government in 1979, and the destruction of the Janata coalition.

In retirement, through the 1980s, he continued to write; he was especially caustic on Constitutional issues, where he set himself the task of defending the Constitution in the media against those who would seek to modify it to centralise power or to replace the Parliamentary system with a Presidential one, fearing a 'slow slide to despotism.''

He showed less antipathy to the memory of Indira Gandhi than could have been expected, reserving his anger for Jawaharlal Nehru, who he seemed to think "could have set a standard beyond reproach, but did not."

Family and early life
Madhu Limaye, was born in a Brahmin family his name was Ramchandra Mahadev Limaye, was born in Pune on 1 May 1922. He was educated at the Fergusson College, Poona (now Pune). He married Professor Champa Limaye and had one son. He was previously associated with the Indian National Congress, 1938—48 and the Congress Socialist Party, 1938—1948. His education was interrupted due to participation in the freedom movement. He was imprisoned for 4 years between 1940 and 1945.

Socialist
Attended Socialist International’s Antwerp conference as a sole delegate of Indian Socialist Movement, 1947. Elected, Member National Executive of the Socialist Party at Nasik Conference, 1948. Joint Secretary, Socialist Party, 1949—52. Secretary Asian Socialist Bureau, Rangoon, 1953. Elected, Joint Secretary, Praja Socialist Party at its first Conference at Allahabad, 1953.

Goa Liberation Movement
Sentenced to 12 years imprisonment in the Goa liberation movement in 1955. Spent over 19 months in Portuguese captivity.

Parliamentarian

Chairman, Socialist Party 1958–59. Chairman Samyukta Socialist Party Parliamentary Board, 1967–68. Leader, Socialist Group in Fourth Lok Sabha, 1967.

Term as Member of Parliament 
 (i) Third Lok Sabha, 1964—67 from Munger (won by-poll)
 (ii) Fourth Lok Sabha, 1967—71 from Munger 
 (iii) Fifth Lok Sabha, 1973—77 from Banka (won by-poll) 
 (iv) Sixth Lok Sabha 1977–79 from Banka.
 He lost General Elections to Lok Sabha from Munger in 1971 and Banka in 1980.

Janata Party

Played an active part in the JP movement and in an effort to create a united opposition party. He was detained under the Maintenance of Internal Security Act (MISA) from July 1975 to February 1977 in various Madhya Pradesh Jails. Resigned in protest, from membership of the fifth Lok Sabha, on immoral extension of its term by Indira Gandhi through abuse of constitutional provisions about emergency. general secretary, Janata Party 1 May 1977–79. general secretary, Janata Party (S) and Lok Dal ,1979–82. Retired from active politics in 1982 after the formation of Lok Dal (K). Wrote more than 60 books in English, Hindi and Marathi.

Social activities

Associated with youth organisations, inspiring speeches, study groups, seminars, libraries, social reform movement and periodicals.

Publications

In English

 Where is the left going?
 Tito's Revolt against Stalin
 Communist Party: Facts and Fiction
 Socialist Communist Interaction in India
 Evolution of the Socialist Policy
 Political Horizons
 Indian Polity in Transition
 India and the World
 Madhu Limaye on Famous Personalities
 Galaxy of Indian Socialist Leaders
 The Age of Hope: Phases of the Socialist Movement
 Politics After Freedom
 The Sino-Indian War: Its Historical and International Background
 Goa Liberation Movement and Madhu Limaye
 Manu, Gandhi, Ambedkar and other Essays
 Religious Bigotry: A Threat to the Ordered State
 Parliament, Judiciary, and Parties – An Electrocardiogram of Politics
 Janata Party Experiment – Part I & II
 Limits to Authority
 Political Controversies and Religious Conflicts in Contemporary India
 Decline of a Political System
 Indian Politics at Crossroads
 Mahatma Gandhi and Jawaharlal Nehru: A Historic Partnership 1916–1948 (Vol. I—Vol. IV)
 Cabinet Government in India
 Problems of India's Foreign Policy
 Indian National Movement: Its ideological and Socio-Economic Dimensions
 Decline of a Political System: Indian Politics at Crossroads
 Birth of Non-Congressism: Opposition Politics (1947–1975), Musings on Current Problems and Past Events
 Contemporary Indian Politics
 President Vs Prime Minister
 Prime Movers: Role of the Individual in History
 Barren Path
 Four Pillar State
 The New Constitutional Amendments
 A Self Liquidating Scheme for Reservation
 Supreme Court's Decision on Backward Class Reservation
 August Struggle – An Appraisal of Quit India Movement
 Dear Popat
 Last Writings
 Madhu Limaye in Parliament (A Monograph on Madhu Limaye containing many of his important speeches in Lok Sabha, Published by Lok Sabha Secretariat – Parliament of India).

In Hindi

 Atmakatha
 Sardar Patel – Suvyavasthit Rajya Ke Preneta
 Baba Saheb Ambedakar – Ek Chintan
 Sankramankaleen Rajneeti
 Dharam Aur Rajneeti
 Rashtrapati Banam Pradhanmantri
 Swatantrata Andolan Ki Vichardhara
 Samasyein Aur Vikalp Marxvaad Aur Gandhivaad
 Aarakshan Ki Neeti
 Bhartiya Rajneeti Ke Antarvirodh
 Bhartiya Rajneeti Ka Sankat
 Sarvajanik Jeevan Main Naitikata Ka Lop
 August Kranti Ka Bahuaayami Paridrashya
 Ayodhya – Vote Bank Ki Vidhwansak Rajneeti
 Communist Party: Kathni Aur Karni
 Mahatma Gandhi – Rashtrapita Kyoon Kehlate Hain
 Rajneeti Ki Shatranj – VP Se PV Tak, Bharatiya Rajneeti Ka Naya Mod
 Aapatkaal: Samvaidhanik Adhinayakvad Ka Prashast Path
 Chaukhamba Raj – Ek Rooprekha.

In Marathi

 Trimantri Yojna
 Communist Zahirnamyachi Shambhar Varshey
 Pakshantar Bandi? Navhey Aniyantrit Neteshahichi Nandi
 Swatantraya Chalvalichi Vichardhara
 Communist Paksachey Antrang
 Samajwad Kaal, Aaj Vva Udya
 Chaukhamba Rajya
 Rashtrapita
 Doctor Ambedkar – Ek Chintan
 Pech Rajakaranatale
 Atmakatha

Legacy
He was responsible for personally grooming many of the names that dominate Bihar politics today, including Laloo Prasad Yadav and Sharad Yadav. The library of Dr. Ram Manohar Lohiya National Law University, Lucknow (RMLNLU), the Madhu Limaye Library, is named after him. A street in Chanakyapuri, New Delhi is named in his honour.

Goa Liberation movement 

He participated in the Goa liberation movement and was imprisoned in 1955. He wrote a book by name of 'Goa Liberation Movement and Madhu Limaye' as a prison diary. The book was published in 1996 on occasion of golden jubilee of the launch of the movement in 1946.

Madhu Limaye Elocution Competition
To commemorate his contribution to the parliamentary debate, every year Madhu Limaye inter-Collegiate Elocution Competition  is organised in Kirti College on his death anniversary i.e. on 8 January. The competition is funded by “Madhu Limaye Smriti Nyas’ a trust formed by Late Smt. Champatai Limaye and is organised every year by Elocution and Debating Association of  Kirti college, (Dadar West). The main purpose of this event is to make the college going students think and brood over the contemporary topics and current issues, which may not come in the realm of their textbooks. Madhu Limaye Memorial Rolling Trophy is awarded to the winning college. The competition is now exerting a favourable influence on student community. Kirti college has organised this competition relentlessly since last nine years. The purpose of this competition  is to find out the truth about the chosen topic and vivisect the burning issue from all possible angles. The Coordinator of this  elocution competition opines that the purpose of an elocution competition is to find out the truth about the chosen topic and vivisect the burning issue from all possible angles. It is certainly not intended merely for amusement of the audience, although it may add to the interest of the listeners to enliven the proceedings and sustain their interest in an otherwise serious subject. Students from degree college are eligible to participate in this competition. .

References

Marathi politicians
India MPs 1977–1979
India MPs 1962–1967
India MPs 1967–1970
India MPs 1971–1977
Goa liberation activists
Politicians from Pune
Indian National Congress politicians from Bihar
Indian socialists
Lok Sabha members from Bihar
People from Banka district
Indians imprisoned during the Emergency (India)
1922 births
1995 deaths
Janata Party politicians
People from Munger district
Lok Dal politicians
Samyukta Socialist Party politicians
Janata Party (Secular) politicians